Mateusz Masternak (born 2 May 1987 in Iwaniska, Poland) is a Polish professional boxer fighting in the Cruiserweight division. He is a former EBU (European) Cruiserweight champion.

Amateur career
Masternak had been living in Iwaniska until he finished primary school and junior high school. He started training boxing at the KSZO Ostrowiec Świętokrzyski club. At the age of 15 he moved to Wrocław where he started training at the Gwardia Wrocław club.

His first coaches in Gwardia were Mariusz Cieślak and Grzegorz Strugała. At the same time, Masternak joined Primary School No. 19 in Wrocław. His crucial year in amateur boxing was 2005, when he became the junior champion of Poland in Middleweight (75 kg). After the success he joined the national junior team.

His first fight in the national team took place in Tallinn during Junior Championship of Europe. Masternak was defeated in the quarter-final. In the same season, a young Pole won bronze medal during Championship of Poland. In the next year he was second. Until that moment his amateur record looked great: 61 wins in 70 fights.

Professional career
In March 2006 Masternak decided to become a professional fighter. His first four professional battles took place in the USA. However, financial problems of his promoter made him come back to Poland.

In May 2007 he signed a contract with new professional group - CENG AG. Masternak participated in the boxing show Perfect Boxing at Spodek Hall in Katowice and defeated Anton Krasnolutsky by technical knockout in the fourth round.

On 3 October Masternak won the WBC Youth Cruiserweight title. During the boxing show in Lublin he defeated Alex Mogylewski from Ukraine, knocking him out in the round of five.

During Polsat Boxing Night in Łódź, organised on 24 October 2009, Masternak defeated another Polish Cruiserweight Łukasz Janik by technical knockout. Masternak dropped the opponent in the first round and in the fifth one. Janik managed to stand on his feet but the referee reasonably decided to stop the clash. The main event of the evening was a clash between Andrew Golota and Tomasz Adamek which was promoted as "Polish Fight of the Century".

Masternak's first WBC title defence took place on 19 December 2009 in Radom. Masternak won by RTD in the seventh round of the bout, defeating Jameson Bostic. Masternak's second and third defences finished with technical knockouts.

On March 6 in Katowice, the Pole's fight was the main event of the  Diamond Boxing Night at Spodek Hall in Katowice, organised by Andrzej Grajewski. Masternak finished Faisal Ibnel Arrami in the round of eight, winning by technical knockout. The uneven bout was stopped by the corner of "African King". After the seventh round, all three judges scored 70:63 for the Pole, which means that "Master" was better in each round.

Masternak vs. Jomardashvili 
Three months later, on 19 June in Kielce, Masternak beat Lewan Jomardashvili, previously undefeated. The Polish cruiserweight was exerting pressure on the Georgian rival from the first bell. In the fourth round, after series of Masternak's accurate hooks, Jomardashvili was dropped on the canvas two times. In the fifth one, the referee Grzegorz Molenda stopped the contest.

Masternak vs. Abdoul 
On 5 November 2010, Masternak defeated Ismail Abdoul by unanimous decision.

Masternak vs. Bellew 
On 12 December 2015, Mateusz Masternak lost the EBU European cruiserweight title bout to England's Tony Bellew (25-2-1, 16KOs) at The O2 Arena, London. The judges scored the contest 115-113, 115-112, 115-112 all in favour of Bellew.

Masternak vs. Kalenga 
Masternak beat Youri Kayembre Kalenga by technical knockout in the 6th round on 21 April 2018.

Masternak vs. Dorticos 
On 20 October 2018, Mateusz Masternak lost in the quarter-final bout of the World Boxing Super Series cruiserweight tournament. Dorticos was ranked #7 by the WBA, #8 by the WBC, #13 by the IBF and #15 by the WBO. Yunier Dorticos (23-1, 21 KOs) won a tough twelve round unanimous decision over Masternak (41-5, 28 KOs). The scores were 116-112, 115-113, 115-113.

Professional boxing record

{|class="wikitable" style="text-align:center"
|-
!
!Result
!Record
!Opponent
!Type
!Round, time
!Date
!Location
!Notes
|-align=center
|52
|Win
|47–5
|align=left| Jason Whateley 
|
|
|
|align=left|
|align=left|
|-align=center
|51
|Win
|46–5
|align=left| Armend Xhoxhaj 
|
|
|
|align=left|
|align=left|
|-align=center
|50
|Win
|45–5
|align=left| Felipe Nsue 
|
|
|
|align=left|
|align=left|
|-align=center
|49
|Win
|44–5
|align=left| Adam Balski 
|
|
|
|align=left|
|align=left|
|-align=center
|48
|Win
|43–5
|align=left| Jose Gregorio Ulrich
|
|
|
|align=left|
|align=left|
|-align=center
|47
|Win
|42–5
|align=left| Taylor Mabika
|
|
|
|align=left|
|align=left|
|-align=center
|46
|Loss
|41–5
|align=left| Yuniel Dorticos
|
|
|
|align=left|
|align=left|
|-align=center
|45
|Win
|41–4
|align=left| Youri Kayembre Kalenga
|
|
|
|align=left|
|align=left|
|-align=center
|44
|Win
|40–4
|align=left| Stivens Bujaj
|
|
|
|align=left|
|style="text-align:left;"|
|-align=center
|43
|Win
|39–4
|align=left| Ismail Sillakh
|
|
|
|align=left|
|align=left|
|-align=center
|42
|Win
|38–4
|align=left| Alexander Kubich
|
|
|
|align=left|
|align=left|
|- align=center
|41
|Win
|37–4
|align=left| Eric Fields
|
|
|
|align=left|
|align=left|
|- align=center
|40
|Loss
|36–4
|align=left| Tony Bellew
|
|
|
|align=left|
|align=left|
|- align=center
|39
|Win
|36–3
|align=left| Carlos Ailton Nascimento
|
|
| || align=left| 
|align=left|
|-align=center
|-align=center
|38
|Loss
|35–3
|align=left| Johnny Muller
|
|
| || align=left|
|align=left|
|-align=center
|-align=center
|37
|Win
|35–2
|align=left| Ruben Angel Mino
|
|
| || align=left|
|align=left|
|-align=center
|-align=center
|36
|Win
|34–2
|align=left| Jean-Marc Mormeck
|
|
| || align=left|
|align=left|
|-align=center
|-align=center
|35
|Win
|33–2
|align=left| Ben Nsafoah
| || 
| || align=left|
|align=left|
|-align=center
|-align=center
|34
|Loss
|32–2
|align=left| Youri Kayembre Kalenga
| || 
| || align=left|
|align=left|
|-align=center
|33
|Win
|32–1
|align=left| Stjepan Vugdelija
| ||  
| || align=left|
|align=left|
|-align=center
|32
|Win
|31–1
|align=left| Sandro Siproshvili
| || 
| || align=left|
|align=left|
|-align=center
|31
|Loss
|30-1
|align=left| Grigory Drozd
| || 
| || align=left|
|align=left|
|-align=center
|30
|Win
|30–0
|align=left| Shawn Corbin
| || 
| || align=left|
|align=left|
|-align=center
|29
|Win
|29–0
|align=left| Juho Haapoja
| ||  
| || align=left|
|align=left|
|-align=center
|28
|Win
|28–0
|align=left| David Quinonero
||| 
| || align=left|
|align=left|
|-align=center
|27
|Win
|27–0
|align=left| Hari Miles
| ||  
| || align=left|
|align=left|
|-align=center
|26
|Win
|26–0
|align=left| Felipe Romero
| || 
| || align=left|
|align=left|
|-align=center
|25
|Win
|25–0
|align=left| Michael Simms
| || 
| || align=left|
|align=left|
|-align=center
|24
|Win
|24–0
|align=left| Carl Davis
| || 
||| align=left|
|align=left| 
|-align=center
|23
|Win
|23–0
|align=left| Arturs Kulikauskis
| || 
| || align=left|
|align=left| 
|-align=center
|22
|Win
|22–0
|align=left| Ali Ismailov
| || 
| || align=left|
|align=left|  
|-align=center
|21
|Win
|21–0
|align=left| Ismail Abdoul  	 
| ||  
| || align=left|
|align=left|  
|-align=center
|20
|Win
|20–0
|align=left| Levan Jomardashvili	
| || 
| || align=left|
|align=left| 
|-align=center
|19
|Win
|19–0
|align=left| Marco Heinichen
| || 
| || align=left|
|align=left|
|-align=center
|18
|Win
|18–0
|align=left| Faisal Ibnel Arrami
| || 
| || align=left|
|align=left| 
|-align=center
|17
|Win
|17–0
|align=left| Tino Fröhlich
| || 
| || align=left|
|align=left| 
|-align=center
|16
|Win
|16–0
|align=left| Jameson Bostic
| || 
| || align=left|
|align=left| 
|-align=center
|15
|Win
|15–0
|align=left| Łukasz Janik
| || 
| || align=left|
|align=left|
|-align=center
|14
|Win
|14–0
|align=left| Mazur Ali
| || 
| || align=left|
|align=left|
|-align=center
|13
|Win
|13–0
|align=left| Laszlo Hubert  	
| || 
| || align=left|
|align=left| 
|-align=center
|12
|Win
|12–0
|align=left| Yavor Marinchev
| || 
| || align=left|
|align=left|
|-align=center
|11
|Win
|11–0
|align=left| Alex Mogylewski
| || 
| || align=left|
|align=left| 
|-align=center
|10
|Win
|10–0
|align=left| Artem Solomko
|UD ||  
| || align=left|
|align=left|
|-align=center
|9
|Win
|9–0
|align=left| Dmytro Sharypov
| || 
| || align=left|
|align=left|
|-align=center
|8
|Win
|8–0
|align=left| Ronny Daniels
| ||  
| || align=left| 
|align=left|
|-align=center
|7
|Win
|7–0
|align=left| Artem Shchehlov
| ||  
| || align=left|
|align=left|
|-align=center
|6
|Win
|6–0
|align=left| Taras Boyko
| ||  
| || align=left|
|align=left|
|-align=center
|5
|Win
|5–0
|align=left| Anton Krasnolutsky
| || 
| || align=left|
|align=left|
|-align=center
|4
|Win
|4–0
|align=left| William Chouloute
| || 
| || align=left|
|align=left|
|-align=center
|3
|Win
|3–0
|align=left| Jason Medina
| || 
| || align=left|
|align=left|
|-align=center
|2
|Win
|2–0
|align=left| Gregory Holmes
| || 
| || align=left|
|align=left|
|-align=center
|1
|Win
|1–0
|align=left| Anton Lascek
| || 
| || align=left|
|align=left|
|-align=center

References

External links
 
 Mateusz Masternak - Profile, News Archive & Current Rankings at Box.Live

Living people
1987 births
People from Opatów County
Sportspeople from Świętokrzyskie Voivodeship
Polish male boxers
Cruiserweight boxers